The 1997–98 Serie A season was the 64th season of the Serie A, the top level of ice hockey in Italy. 14 teams participated in the league, and HC Bozen won the championship by defeating WSV Sterzing in the final.

First round

Final round

Qualification round

Playoffs

Qualification 
 WSV Sterzing - HC Courmaosta 2:1 (5:2, 2:3, 5:4)
 HC Alleghe - SG Cortina 0:2 (4:5 n.V., 4:5 n.V.)

Bracket

Relegation

External links
 Season on hockeyarchives.info

1997–98 in Italian ice hockey
Serie A (ice hockey) seasons
Italy